Avobenzone (trade names Parsol 1789, Milestab 1789, Eusolex 9020, Escalol 517, Neo Heliopan 357 and others, INCI Butyl Methoxydibenzoylmethane) is an oil-soluble ingredient used in sunscreen products to absorb the full spectrum of UVA rays.

History
Avobenzone was patented in 1973 and was approved in the EU in 1978. It was approved by the FDA in 1988. The FDA does not consider avobenzone as generally recognised as safe and effective citing the need for additional safety data despite that fact that it has been used in sunscreens for over the 40 years.

Properties 
Pure avobenzone is a whitish to yellowish crystalline powder with a weak odor, dissolving in isopropanol,  dimethyl sulfoxide, decyl oleate, capric acid/caprylic, triglycerides and other oils. It is not soluble in water.

Avobenzone is a dibenzoylmethane derivative. Avobenzone exists in the ground state as a mixture of the enol and keto forms, favoring the chelated enol. This enol form is stabilized by intramolecular hydrogen-bonding within the β-diketone. Its ability to absorb ultraviolet light over a wider range of wavelengths than many other sunscreen agents has led to its use in many commercial preparations marketed as "broad spectrum" sunscreens. Avobenzone has an absorption maximum of 357 nm.

Safety 
Avobenzone, a petroleum-based sunscreen active ingredient, is not generally recognised as safe and effective by the FDA. A recent study at Lomonosov Moscow State University found that chlorinated water and ultraviolet light can cause avobenzone to disintegrate into various other organic compounds, including;  aromatic acids, aldehydes, phenols, and acetophenones which can cause adverse health effects.

Countries with states or areas that have banned avobenzone: red. Considering ban: yellow. 

Japan. Hawaii, United States of America. Marine Parks, Thailand. Palau. Nature reserves, Mexico. Virgin Islands, United States of America. Bonaire.

Brazil and the EU are considering a ban

Stability 
Avobenzone is sensitive to the properties of the solvent, being relatively stable in polar protic solvents and unstable in nonpolar environments. Also, when it is irradiated with UVA light, it generates a triplet excited state in the keto form which can either cause the avobenzone to degrade or it can transfer energy to biological targets and cause deleterious effects.

Avobenzone has been shown to degrade significantly in light, resulting in less protection over time. The UV-A light in a day of sunlight in a temperate climate is sufficient to break down most of the compound. Data presented to the Food and Drug Administration by the Cosmetic, Toiletry and Fragrance Association indicates a −36% change in avobenzone's UV absorbance following one hour of exposure to sunlight. This degradation can be reduced by using a photostabilizer, like octocrylene. Other photostabilizers include:
 4-Methylbenzylidene camphor (USAN Enzacamene)
 Tinosorb S (USAN Bemotrizinol, INCI Bis-Ethylhexyloxyphenol Methoxyphenyl Triazine)
 Tinosorb M (USAN Bisoctrizole, INCI Methylene Bis-Benzotriazolyl Tetramethylbutylphenol)
 Butyloctyl Salicylate (Tradename HallBrite BHB - )
 Hexadecyl Benzoate
 Butyloctyl Benzoate
 HallBrite PSF (INCI Undecylcrylene DimethiconeE)
 Mexoryl SX (USAN Ecamsule, INCI Terephthalylidene Dicamphor Sulfonic Acid)
 Synoxyl HSS (INCI Trimethoxybenzylidene Pentanedione)
 Corapan TQ (INCI Diethylhexyl 2,6-Naphthalate)
 Parsol SLX (INCI Polysilicone-15)
 Oxynex ST (INCI Diethylhexyl Syringylidene Malonate
 Polycrylene (INCI Polyester-8)
 SolaStay S1 (INCI Ethylhexyl Methoxycrylene)
Octyl Salicylate (INCI  Ethylhexyl Salicylate)

Complexing avobenzone with cyclodextrins may also increase its photostability. Formulations of avobenzone with hydroxypropyl-beta-cyclodextrin have shown significant reduction in photo-induced degradation, as well as decreased transdermal penetration of the UV absorber when used in high concentrations.

The photostability of avobenzone is further increased when sunscreens are formulated with  antioxidant compounds. Mangiferin, glutathione, ubiquinone, vitamin C, vitamin E, beta-carotene and trans-resveratrol have all demonstrated some ability to protect avobenzone from photodegradation. The stability and efficacy of avobenzone seems to continue to increase as a greater amount of antioxidants are added to the sunscreen.

According to some studies, "the most effective sunscreens contain avobenzone and titanium dioxide."  Avobenzone can degrade faster in light in combination with mineral UV absorbers like zinc oxide and titanium dioxide, though with the right coating of the mineral particles this reaction can be reduced.  A manganese doped titanium dioxide may be better than undoped titanium dioxide to improve avobenzone's stability.

Various 
As an enolate, avobenzone forms with heavy metal ions (such as Fe3+) colored complexes, and chelating agents can be added to suppress them. Stearates, aluminum, magnesium and zinc salts can lead to poorly soluble precipitates. Manufacturers also recommend to avoid the inclusion of iron and ferric salts, heavy metals, formaldehyde donors and PABA and PABA esters. The makers of Coppertone advise that avobenzone binds iron and can cause staining of clothes washed in iron-rich water. The staining properties of sunblock made with avobenzone are particularly noticeable on fiberglass boats with white gelcoat.

Avobenzone also reacts with boron trifluoride to form a stable crystalline complex that is highly fluorescent under UV irradiation. The emission color of the crystals depends on the molecular packing of the boron avobenzone complex. The photoluminescence may also be altered by mechanical force in the solid state, resulting in a phenomenon called "mechanochromic luminescence". The altered emission color recovers itself slowly at room temperature or more swiftly at higher temperatures.

Absorbance Spectrum 
Avobenzone has a peak absorbance around 360 nm when dissolved. The peak may shift slightly depending on the solvent.

Preparation 
The compound is prepared by reacting 4-tert-butylbenzoic methyl ester (from 4-tert-butylbenzoic acid by esterification with methanol) with 4-methoxyacetophenone in toluene in the presence of sodium amide via Claisen condensation.

According to a recent patent application, yields of up to 95% are obtained with the same starting materials in toluene in the presence of potassium methoxide.

It is subject to keto-enol tautomerism and exists predominantly enol when dissolved. Upon UV radiation, it may convert to keto form, while converting back to enol form after placing in dark.

See also
Sun protection factor

Notes

Aromatic ketones
Piceol ethers
Sunscreening agents
Tert-butyl compounds